Pyrausta arizonicalis is a moth in the family Crambidae. It was described by Eugene G. Munroe in 1976. It is found in North America, where it has been recorded from Texas, New Mexico and Arizona.

Adults are on wing from April to November.

References

Moths described in 1976
arizonicalis
Moths of North America